The Licei Linguistico e Pedagogico is a languages school, located in Montepulciano, Province of Siena, Tuscany, Italy.

Its history goes back to the Scuole Granducali opened by Leopold II, Grand Duke of Tuscany in 1774.

External links
 Sito.liceipoliziani.com
 Liceipoliziani.com

Buildings and structures in Montepulciano
Schools in Tuscany